Baron Altrincham, of Tormarton in the County of Gloucester, is a title in the Peerage of the United Kingdom. It was created on 1 August 1945 for the politician Edward Grigg. His son, the second Baron, was a politician, journalist, historian and writer. Soon after the passage of the Peerage Act 1963 on 31 July 1963, he disclaimed the title for life.  the title is held by his nephew, who succeeded as 4th Baron  on his father's death in that year.

Barons Altrincham (1945)
Edward William Macleay Grigg, 1st Baron Altrincham (1879–1955)
John Edward Poynder Grigg, 2nd Baron Altrincham (1924–2001) (disclaimed 1963)
Anthony Ulick David Dundas Grigg, 3rd Baron Altrincham (1934–2020)
(Edward) Sebastian Grigg, 4th Baron Altrincham  (b. 1965).
The heir apparent is the present holder's son Edward Laurence Dundas de Miramont Grigg (b. 1995).

Line of succession

  Edward William MacLeay Grigg, 1st Baron Altrincham (1879—1955)
 John Edward Poynder Grigg (1924—2001) (disclaimed 1963)
  Anthony Ulrick David Dundas Grigg, 3rd Baron Altrincham (1934–2020)
 Edward Sebastian Grigg, 4th Baron Altrincham (b. 1965)
 (1) Edward Laurence Dundas De Miramont Grigg (b. 1995)
 (2) Anthony George Seymour Sebastian Grigg (b. 1997)
 (3) Steven Thomas Grigg (b. 1969)

Notes

References
Kidd, Charles, Williamson, David (editors). Debrett's Peerage and Baronetage (1990 edition). New York: St Martin's Press, 1990, 

Baronies in the Peerage of the United Kingdom
Noble titles created in 1945
Noble titles created for UK MPs